The UK Dance Chart is a weekly chart that ranks the biggest-selling dance singles in the United Kingdom, and is compiled by the Official Charts Company. The dates listed in the menus below represent the Saturday after the Sunday the chart was announced, as per the way the dates are given in chart publications such as the ones produced by Billboard, Guinness, and Virgin. In 2005, the chart was based on sales of CD singles and 12-inch singles, and was published in the UK magazines ChartsPlus and Music Week and on BBC Radio 1's official website. During the year, 37 singles reached number one.

The biggest-selling dance hit of 2005 was "Hung Up" by Madonna—it sold nearly 328,000 copies in the UK and topped the UK Singles Chart. "Hung Up" was also the longest-running number one of year, spending four weeks at the top; it was the longest running number one since "Lola's Theme" by Shapeshifters had spent five weeks at number one the previous year. Other high-selling dance singles included "I Like the Way" by Bodyrockers, which sold over 188,000 copies, and "Shot You Down" by Audio Bullys featuring Nancy Sinatra, which sold nearly 161,000 singles. Both "I Like the Way" and "Shot You Down" reached Number 3 on the UK Singles Chart. Four acts topped the chart with more than one single. They were: Daft Punk, Pendulum, Basement Jaxx and The Prodigy. The only act to top the chart with more than two singles was Mylo, who reached number one with "Destroy Rock & Roll", "In My Arms" and "Doctor Pressure".

Chart-topping singles from the 2005 UK Dance Chart also included "Do Your Thing" by Basement Jaxx, which reached number one after being used in an advert for British television network ITV. The Prodigy topped the chart with a rerelease of their previous singles "Voodoo People" and "Out of Space", which were remixed by fellow chart-toppers Pendulum and Audio Bullys.

Chart history

See also
List of number-one singles of 2005 (UK)
List of UK Dance Albums Chart number ones of 2005
List of UK Indie Chart number-one singles of 2005
List of UK Rock Chart number-one singles of 2005

References
General

Specific

External links
Dance Singles Chart at the Official Charts Company
UK Top 40 Dance Singles at BBC Radio 1

2005
2005 in British music
United Kingdom Dance Singles